The 2013 Grand Prix GSB was a one-day women's cycle race in the Grand Prix GSB series held in El Salvador on March 7, 2013. The race was won by the Brazilian  Clemilda Fernandes Silva, beating the Be Pink pairing of Alena Amialiusik and Noemi Cantele.

References

2013 in Salvadoran sport
2013 in women's road cycling
Grand Prix GSB